Sampson is an unincorporated community in northern Webster County, in the U.S. state of Missouri.

History
A post office called Sampson was established in 1904, and remained in operation until 1935. The community has the name of the local Sampson family.

References

Unincorporated communities in Webster County, Missouri
Unincorporated communities in Missouri